Vijayta Pandit is an Indian actress and playback singer, most famous for her first film Love Story (1981).

Early life and background
Vijayta comes from a musical family originating from Pili Mandori Village in Hissar district of Haryana state. Pandit Jasraj is her uncle. Her older sister is Sulakshana Pandit, and like her, is an actress and playback singer. Her brothers are music directors Jatin Pandit and Lalit Pandit, better known as Jatin–Lalit.

Career
Rajendra Kumar cast her alongside his son Kumar Gaurav in Love Story (1981), which became a "blockbuster" at the box office. She and Gaurav played star-crossed lovers, and they also developed a relationship off-screen. After the film became a hit, she turned down film offers wanting to be with Gaurav. But the relationship ended, due to family tensions. Vijayta went back to films and had another hit Mohabbat (1985).

She was also briefly married to film director Sameer Malkan who directed her in the flop Car Thief (1986). After a few more films, she quit acting and concentrated on playback singing. Her husband, composer Aadesh Shrivastava has produced a pop album titled Propose – Pyaar ka Izhaar which marks Vijayta's debut as a pop singer. Actress Madhuri Dixit launched the album for the press in February 2007.

Some films wherein Vijayta played the lead are Jeete Hain Shaan Se (1986), Deewana Tere Naam Ka (1987), Zalzala (1988), Pyar Ka Toofan (1990). She also sang for films like Jo Jeeta Wohi Sikandar (1992), Kabhi Haan Kabhi Naa (1993), Saazish (1998), Dev (2004) and Chingaari (2006).

Apart from Hindi films, she has also starred in the blockbuster Bengali film Amar Sangi (1987) along with Prasenjit directed by Sujit Guha. She also sang a song for Bengali movie Biyer Phool.

References

External links

 

1967 births
Living people
Actresses in Hindi cinema
20th-century Indian actresses
21st-century Indian actresses
Actresses from Mumbai
Musicians from Mumbai